The X-planes are a series of experimental United States aircraft and rockets, used to test and evaluate new technologies and aerodynamic concepts. They have an X designator within the US system of aircraft designations, which denotes the experimental research mission.

Not all US experimental aircraft have been designated as X-planes; some received US Navy designations before 1962, while others have been known only by manufacturers' designations, non-'X'-series designations, or classified codenames. This list only includes the designated X-planes.

History
The X-planes concept officially came into being in 1944, as a joint programme between the National Advisory Committee for Aeronautics (NACA), the US Navy (USN) and the US Army Air Force (USAAF), in order to pursue research into high-speed aircraft. NACA later became the National Aeronautics and Space Administration (NASA) and the USAAF became the United States Air Force (USAF). Other organizations such as the Defence Advanced Research Projects Agency (DARPA) and the US Marine Corps (USMC) have also since sponsored X-plane projects.

The first experimental aircraft specification, for a transonic rocket plane, was placed in 1945, and the first operational flight of an X-plane took place when the Bell X-1 made its first powered flight nearly three years later at Muroc Air Force Base, California, now known as Edwards Air Force Base. The majority of X-plane testing has since taken place there.

X-planes have since accomplished many aviation "firsts" including breaking speed and altitude barriers, varying wing sweep in flight, implementing exotic alloys and propulsion innovations, and many more.

New X-planes appeared fairly regularly for many years until the flow temporarily stopped in the early 1970s. A series of experimental hypersonic projects, including an advanced version of the Martin Marietta X-24 lifting body, were turned down. Eventually issues with the Rockwell HiMAT advanced UAV led to a crewed X-plane with forward sweep, the Grumman X-29, which flew in 1984.

Some of the X-planes have been well publicized, while others, such as the X-16, have been developed in secrecy. The first, the Bell X-1, became well known in 1947 after it became the first aircraft to break the sound barrier in level flight.  Later X-planes supported important research in a multitude of aerodynamic and technical fields, but only the North American X-15 rocket plane of the early 1960s achieved comparable fame to that of the X-1.  X-planes 8, 9, 11, 12, and 17 were actually missiles used to test new types of engines, and some other vehicles were unoccupied or UAVs (some were remotely flown, some were partially or fully autonomous).

Most X-planes are not expected to go into full-scale production; one exception was the Lockheed Martin X-35, which competed against the Boeing X-32 during the Joint Strike Fighter Program, and has entered production as the F-35 Lightning II.

List
In the list, the date is that of the first flight, or of cancellation if it never flew.

See also
 Experimental aircraft
 List of experimental aircraft
 List of military aircraft of the United States

Notes

References

Bibliography

External links
 
 Early X-planes
 X-15 Videos by NASA

Lists of aircraft by role

United States experimental aircraft